The Dogsnatcher EP is an EP by Babyland, released in 1992 by Flipside.

Track listing

Personnel
Adapted from the liner notes of The Dogsnatcher EP.

Babyland
 Dan Gatto – lead vocals, keyboards
 Michael Smith – percussion

Production and design
 Rusty Cusick – recording

Release history

References

External links 
 

1992 EPs
Babyland albums
Flipside (fanzine) albums